Ethna Frances Rouse  (born 29 December 1937) is a New Zealand former cricketer who played as a left-handed batter. She appeared in one Test match and three One Day Internationals for New Zealand in 1972 and 1973. She played domestic cricket for Canterbury.

In the 2004 New Year Honours, Rouse was awarded the Queen's Service Medal for community service.

References

External links
 
 

1937 births
Living people
Cricketers from Christchurch
New Zealand women cricketers
New Zealand women Test cricketers
New Zealand women One Day International cricketers
Canterbury Magicians cricketers
Recipients of the Queen's Service Medal